is a Japanese voice actor, employed by the talent management firm 81 Produce. He is best known for his role as Danzo Shimura in Naruto.

Filmography

Television animation
 1984: Sei Jūshi Bismarck as Professor Charles Louvre
 1991: Armored Police Metal Jack as Fujihara
 1994: Montana Jones as Professor Giruto, Ambassador Soun
 1997: Detective Conan as Genichiro Kaneshiro
 1998: Alice SOS as Saboten Daimaoh
 1998: Yu-Gi-Oh! as Chief Inspector
 1999: Pokémon Arujii
 1999: Zoids: Chaotic Century as Zeppelin II, Gaas
 2000: Tottoko Hamtaro as Old Man Roko
 2001-2002: Sabaku no Kaizoku! Captain Kuppa as Buritō
 2002: Rockman EXE as Eldest Cutman
 2003: Babar the Elephant (King Nōfan)
 2005: Starship Operators as President Rau
 2007: Naruto Shippuden as Danzō Shimura
 2010: Fullmetal Alchemist: Brotherhood as Gardner
 2014: Barakamon (Kōsaku Kotoishi
 2018: Ulysses: Jeanne d'Arc to Renkin no Kishi as Nicolas Flamel

OVA
 1998: Legend of the Galactic Heroesas Klaus Von Lichtenlade
 2005: FLCL as Shigekuni Nandaba

Movie
 2002: Atashin'chi as Gramps
 1986: Laputa: Castle in the Sky as Mentor

Video games
 1998: Psychic Force 2012 as Genshin Kanjō
 1999: Ace Combat 3: Electrosphere as Gabriel W. Clarkson
 1999: Shadow Hearts: Covenant as Zeppeto
 1999: Psychic Force 2 as Genshin Kanjō
 2002: Resident Evil Zero as James Marcus
 2006: Final Fantasy XII as Archadian Senator
 2012: Asura's Wrath as Chakravartin

Dubbing

References

External links and references
Ito Hiroshi (at 81 Produce site)

1933 births
81 Produce voice actors
Living people
Japanese male voice actors
Male voice actors from Fukuoka Prefecture